KKWY may refer to:

 KKWY (FM), a radio station (88.1 FM) licensed to serve Wheatland, Wyoming, United States; see List of radio stations in Wyoming
 KKWY (Colorado), a defunct radio station (88.7 FM) formerly licensed to serve Estes Park, Colorado, United States